Azraq ( meaning "blue") is a small town in Zarqa Governorate in central-eastern Jordan,  east of Amman. The population of Azraq was 9,021 in 2004. The Muwaffaq Salti Air Base is located in Azraq.

History

Prehistory

Archaeological evidence indicates that Azraq has been occupied for hundreds of thousands of years, with the oldest known remains dating to the Lower Palaeolithic, around 500–300,000 years ago. The spring-fed oasis provided a more or less constant source of water throughout this period, and probably acted as a refugium for humans and other animals at times when the surrounding area dried out. The oasis itself changed as the climate fluctuated: at times a permanent lake, a marsh, or a seasonal playa.

During the Epipalaeolithic period the oasis was also an important focus of settlement.

Later history

Azraq has long been an important settlement in a remote and now-arid desert area of Jordan. The town is also located on a major desert route that would have facilitated trade within the region.

Nabatean period settlement activity has also been documented in the area. Qasr Azraq was built by the Romans in the 3rd century AD, and was heavily modified in the Middle Ages by the Mameluks. In the Umayyad period a water reservoir was constructed in southern Azraq.

During the Arab Revolt in the early 20th century, Qasr Azraq was an important headquarters for T. E. Lawrence.

The site had been previously used during the Gulf War of 1990–91 as a transit camp for displaced Iraqis and Kuwaitis.

Demographics

According to the Jordan National Census of 2004, the population of Azraq was 9,021, of whom 7,625 (84.5%) were Jordanian citizens. 4,988 (55.3%) were males, and 4,033 (44.7%) females. The next census was conducted in 2014.

Wildlife reserve

Azraq is also the site of one of Jordan's seven protected nature reserve areas (set up by the Royal Society for the Conservation of Nature): the Azraq Wetlands Reserve in Azraq al-Janoubi (South Azraq).

See also

Azraq Wetland Reserve
Desert castles, of which the Azraq oasis has two: Qasr Azraq and Qasr Ain es-Sil
Druze in Jordan

References

Further reading

External Links
Photos of Azraq at the American Center of Research

Populated places in Zarqa Governorate
Oases of Jordan
Druze communities in Jordan